Arkansas Midland Railroad may refer to:
Arkansas Midland Railroad (1992), a shortline railroad that bought several former Missouri Pacific Railroad lines in 1992
Arkansas Midland Railroad (1853–1871) and Arkansas Midland Railroad (1877–1912), narrow gauge predecessors of the Missouri Pacific Railroad